Levelock is a census-designated place (CDP) along the Kvichak River in Lake and Peninsula Borough, Alaska, United States. It was known by the indigenous name of Kivichakh, a variant of Kvichak. At the 2020 census the population was 69, same amount as in 2010.

Geography
Levelock is located at  (59.110141, -156.858684).

Demographics

Levelock first appeared on the 1890 U.S. Census as the native village of "Kivichakh." It did not appear again until 1950, as Levelock. It was made a census-designated place (CDP) in 1980.

As of the census of 2000, there were 122 people, 45 households, and 25 families residing in the CDP. The population density was 8.4 people per square mile (3.2/km2). There were 50 housing units at an average density of 3.4 per square mile (1.3/km2). The racial makeup of the CDP was 4.92% White, 89.34% Native American, and 5.74% from two or more races. 2.46% of the population were Hispanic or Latino of any race.

There were 45 households, out of which 37.8% had children under the age of 18 living with them, 33.3% were married couples living together, 11.1% had a female householder with no husband present, and 44.4% were non-families. 42.2% of all households were made up of individuals, and 11.1% had someone living alone who was 65 years of age or older. The average household size was 2.71 and the average family size was 3.96.

In the CDP, the population was spread out, with 40.2% under the age of 18, 8.2% from 18 to 24, 22.1% from 25 to 44, 22.1% from 45 to 64, and 7.4% who were 65 years of age or older. The median age was 28 years. For every 100 females, there were 144.0 males. For every 100 females age 18 and over, there were 128.1 males.

The median income for a household in the CDP was $18,750, and the median income for a family was $31,667. Males had a median income of $30,417 versus $30,417 for females. The per capita income for the CDP was $12,199. There were 16.7% of families and 24.5% of the population living below the poverty line, including 29.7% of under eighteens and 50.0% of those over 64.

The Tribal Village of Levelock has three key economic drivers: tourism (sport fishing and lodges), a commercial seafood plant scheduled to open 2018-19 and tender services along the major river systems of southwest Alaska. In 2017, the village provided increased transparency of these and other projects.

Notable residents 
 Adelheid Herrmann, Alaskan state legislator (1983–89), researcher

References

Census-designated places in Lake and Peninsula Borough, Alaska
Census-designated places in Alaska